Paki Massabong is a chiefdom of Bombali District in the Northern Province of Sierra Leone. The principal town lies at Mapaki.

As of 2004 the chiefdom has a population of 17,320.

References

Chiefdoms of Sierra Leone
Northern Province, Sierra Leone